Florence Rey (born August 27, 1975) and her boyfriend Audry Maupin (born April 20, 1972) were involved in a shoot-out in central Paris on October 4, 1994 following a high speed car chase. The incident dramatically involved homicide, hostage-taking and violent robbery all in the space of 25 minutes. The incident caused the deaths of five people; three policemen, a taxi driver, and Maupin. It was a major case in France and received much attention from the media.

Background

Florence Rey, the daughter of a schoolteacher, was a 19-year-old student. After dropping out of medicine school, she studied literature. Audry Maupin, 22, was a philosophy sophomore at the University of Nanterre.  At the time of the incident they were living together in a squat in an abandoned bourgeoise house in Nanterre. The pair were already under observation by the Renseignements Généraux, the French intelligence services, prior to the incident due to their involvement with an underground political group. When the police searched their squat after the killings, they found revolutionary and anarchist literature, such as The Society of the Spectacle by Guy Debord. They found the couple's writings, which echoed surrealism, radicalism and situationism.

Details of incident

The incident began at 9:25 pm on October 4, 1994, at the Porte de Pantin car pound.  The pair climbed the perimeter fence with the intention of stealing the service firearms of the two policemen on night duty inside and neutralizing them with their own handcuffs.  They discovered that the two officers did not carry handcuffs so they sprayed them with tear gas before making their escape.  Outside they boarded a taxi waiting at a red light driven by a taxi driver named Amadou Dialoo.  A passenger, Georges Monnier, was already on board and they threatened them with their arms, ordering the driver to drive to the Place de la Nation.

Ten minutes after hijacking the taxi, having reached the edge of Place de la Nation, Dialoo noticed a police patrol car with three officers returning to their base in the 11th arrondissement after finishing their duty. Dialoo decided to provoke an accident, ran a red light and slammed into the patrol car. The three officers jumped out and Rey and Maupin opened fire, killing two of them, Laurent Gerard and Thierry Memard. The third policeman continued the gunfight while wounded. During the gunfight Maupin fatally shot Dialoo but Monnier had escaped from the taxi and was lying on the ground.

The couple then hijacked a Renault Supercinq driven by Jacky Bensimon and ordered him to drive to the Bois de Vincennes. A chase began and Maupin fired through the rear window of the Renault causing a motorcycle patrolman to be lightly injured hitting the ground. On arrival at Vincennes, there was a road block so Maupin ordered Bensimon not to stop or he would kill him. 100 metres before the road block Bensimon pulled the hand brake which caused the car to spin three times.  Bensimon was thrown out which probably saved his life. A motorcycle policeman, Guy Jacob, approached on foot and was fatally shot by Maupin. The police opened fire on the Renault, fatally wounding Maupin who died at 10pm the following evening at the Kremlin-Bicêtre hospital.  Before being arrested, Florence Rey kissed Maupin without showing any emotion then refused to discuss the incident throughout her interrogation.

Trial in 1998
Rey was held on remand at the Maison d'Arrêt des Femmes at Fleury Merogis while awaiting trial, where she spent her time reading and doing drama.  She never discussed the incident with anyone, including her lawyers. Her trial began on September 17, 1998, at the Assise Court in the Palais de Justice, Paris.  She was defended by two lawyers, Maître Olivia Cligman and Maître Henri Leclerc. Throughout her trial, she continued to show no emotion and Maître Cligman even rebuked her in court for her indifference.  
Ten witnesses were called, but they all gave different versions of the event. The decision as to if she was a murderer or an accomplice rested on ballistic evidence which proved that Maupin fired all of the fatal shots.

The violence and the outrage provoked some to demand the return of capital punishment in France.

On September 30, 1998, the prosecutor asked the court to sentence Rey to 30 years. After her lawyers had delivered their plea, she was given the final opportunity to speak but she chose to remain silent. After five hours of deliberation the jury found her guilty as an accomplice and she was sentenced to 20 years imprisonment.  She served her sentence in the Maison d'Arrêt des Femmes in Rennes.

Abdelhakim Dekhar, who was accused of having supplied a gun to the couple, was sentenced to four years in prison but was released soon after, having already served much of his time before the verdict.

Aftermath
Rey became an icon of the counterculture. For example, the writer Patrick Besson wrote "Sonnet pour Florence Rey", and the band The Kills also wrote a song dedicated to her. The anarchist rock group Chumbawamba dedicated their song "Stitch That" to Florence Rey at live performances shortly after the incident. Artist Chantal Montellier wrote and illustrated a comic book, Les Damnés de Nanterre, to dispute the official account of the event. Rey has refused to give interviews.

After benefiting from a remission of her sentence, Rey was discreetly released on May 3, 2009. During her incarceration, she had received frequent visits from her mother and studied history and geography. She had also worked as a waitress in the prison refectory.

On November 20, 2013, Dekhar was arrested as a suspect in the Paris attacks, where local branches of the bank Société Générale were attacked as well as the newspaper Libération, where a photography assistant was shot and severely injured.

References

Andrew Hussey, The Game Of War: The Life And Death Of Guy Debord (2001)
 Shootout, Documentary (2002), BFI Page

1975 births
Autonomism
French female murderers
French prisoners and detainees
French spree killers
Living people
Mass murder in 1994
Prisoners and detainees of France